Quonopohit (16361712), also known as James Quannapowit, James Quanophkownatt, and James Rumney Marsh, was the successor to whom Wenepoykin, sachem of the Naumkeag people, willed his territories in modern day northeastern Massachusetts at the time of his death in 1684. He is known for deeding these lands to a number of Massachusetts towns in the 1680s, including Marblehead (1684), Lynn, Saugus, Swampscott, Lynnfield, Wakefield, North Reading, and Reading (1686), Salem (1687). He is the namesake of Lake Quannapowitt in Wakefield, Massachusetts.

References

1636 births
1712 deaths
People of colonial Massachusetts
17th-century Native Americans
18th-century Native Americans
Native American leaders
Native American history of Massachusetts
Native American people from Massachusetts